The AIM-26 Falcon was a larger, more powerful version of the AIM-4 Falcon air-to-air missile built by Hughes. It is the only guided American air-to-air missile with a nuclear warhead to be produced; the unguided AIR-2 Genie rocket was also nuclear-armed.

Development 
Starting in 1956 Hughes Electronics began the development of an enlarged version of the GAR-1D Falcon that would carry a nuclear warhead. It was intended to provide a sure kill in attacks on Soviet heavy bomber aircraft, at a time when guided missiles were not accurate enough to produce high-probability kills with small conventional warheads. The original development was for semi-active radar homing and heat-seeking versions based on the conventional GAR-1/GAR-2 weapons, under the designations GAR-5 and GAR-6, respectively. The original program was cancelled.

The program was revived in 1959, now under the name GAR-11. It entered service in 1961, carried by Air Defense Command F-102 Delta Dagger interceptors. It used a radar proximity fuze and semi-active radar homing. The GAR-11 used a sub-kiloton (250 ton) yield W54 warhead shared with the "Davy Crockett" M388 recoilless rifle projectile, rather than the larger W25 warhead of the AIR-2 Genie.

Conventional warhead 
As part of a wider Army/Navy/Air Force renaming project, in 1963 the weapon was redesignated AIM-26. The nuclear version became the AIM-26A, the conventional model the AIM-26B. From 1970 to 1972 the nuclear warheads of the AIM-26A weapons were rebuilt for the nuclear version of the AGM-62 Walleye TV guided bomb. 

The AIM-26 saw little widespread use in American service, retiring in 1972. The conventional AIM-26B was exported to Switzerland as the HM-55, where it was used on Swiss Mirage IIIS fighters. The AIM-26B was produced under license (and modified) in Sweden as the Rb 27, arming Saab Draken J-35F and 35J fighters. It was retired in 1998. When Finland bought Drakens, the license-manufactured Swedish Falcons were included.

Specifications (GAR-11/AIM-26A) 
 Length: 
 Wingspan: 
 Diameter: 
 Weight: 
 Speed: Mach 2
 Range: 
 Guidance: semi-active radar homing
 Warhead: W54 nuclear, explosive yield 250 t TNT equivalent

Survivors 

Below is an incomplete list of museums which have an AIM-26 in their collection:
Museum of Aviation, Warner Robins, Georgia (AIM-26 A)
National Museum of Naval Aviation, Naval Air Station Pensacola, Florida (AIM-26 A)
DVHAA Historical Aircraft Museum, Naval Air Station Joint Reserve Base Willow Grove, Pennsylvania (AIM-26 A)
 Suomen ilmavoimamuseo / Finnish Air Force Museum, Finland (AIM-26 B / RB 27)
 Robotmuseum / Robot Museum Arboga, Sweden (AIM-26 B / RB 27)
 Västerås Flygmuseum / Västerås Aviation Museum Västerås, Sweden (AIM-26 B / RB 27)

See also 
 W54 Warhead
 List of missiles
 Related Development
 AIM-4 Falcon
  GAR-9 / AIM-47 Falcon
 AIM-54 Phoenix

References 

Nuclear anti-aircraft weapons
AIM-026
Military equipment introduced in the 1960s
Swedish Air Force